United States lightship Relief (WLV-605) is a lightvessel now serving as a museum ship in Oakland, California.  Built in 1950, she is one of a small number of surviving lightships, and one of an even smaller number built specifically for the United States Coast Guard.  Along with her sister ship, the WLV-604 Columbia, she is a good example of the last generation of lightships built. She was declared a National Historic Landmark in 1989.

Description and history
WLV-605 is located on the Oakland waterfront, at the far eastern end of the Port of Oakland just west of the Oakland Ferry Terminal. She is register at 400 gross tons. Above-deck features include a steel deckhouse, a breakwater fore, and two steel masts on which its lights are mounted. She also historically carried a fog signal and bell, both operated by hand.

WLV-605 was laid down as WAL-605 in 1949 at the Rice Brothers shipyard in East Boothbay Harbor, Maine.  She was launched on March 4, 1950, just sixteen days after Columbia, and was delivered, fully fitted, to the Coast Guard on February 11, 1951.  She began service at the lightstation "Overfalls" at the entrance to Delaware Bay, serving until 1960, when the station was discontinued.  She then sailed to the west coast, where she served at "Blunts Reef" until 1969; during this time Coast Guard lightvessels were redesignated, and she was redesignated WLV-605.  She was then given the name "Relief", assigned duty to relieve other lightships on the Pacific coast.  She was retired from service in 1975 and decommissioned the following year.

After several unsuccessful attempts to convert her to a museum ship, she was acquired in 1986 by the United States Lighthouse Society, which now maintains the vessel in Oakland.

See also
List of National Historic Landmarks in California
National Register of Historic Places listings in Alameda County, California

References

External links

 U.S, Lightship Relief
 Lightship Relief WAL-605 Online Tour
 National Historic Landmark Nomination

Relief
Relief
Relief
Relief
Ships built in Boothbay, Maine
National Historic Landmark lighthouses
Relief
National Register of Historic Places in Oakland, California
1950 ships
Ships built by Rice Brothers Corporation